

Results
Arsenal's score comes first

Football League Second Division

Final League table

FA Cup

References

1914-15
English football clubs 1914–15 season